Vlaški Do may refer to the following villages in Serbia:
 Vlaški Do (Žabari)
 Vlaški Do (Smederevska Palanka)